A. E. Clarke was a Victorian architect who emigrated to Western Australia in the late 1890s, and practiced in Kalgoorlie.

His works included the School of Mines in Western Australia, and the Leederville Town Hall.

References

Architects from Western Australia
Year of birth missing
Year of death missing
People from Kalgoorlie